State Route 534 (SR 534) is a north–south state highway in the northeastern portion of the U.S. state of Ohio. Its northern terminus is a curve in Geneva-on-the-Lake where the highway directly transitions into SR 531 at that route's western terminus.

Route description
SR 534's path takes it through the western portions of Mahoning, Trumbull and Ashtabula Counties.  There are no segments of this highway that are included within the National Highway System (NHS).  The NHS is a network of highways deemed most important for the nation's economy, mobility and defense.

History
SR 534 debuted in 1937.  It was originally routed along the majority of its current alignment, excepting a short stretch in northwestern Ashtabula County.  Prior to its inception, SR 534 consisted of previously un-numbered roads south of Windsor, and SR 45 from Windsor north to Geneva-on-the-Lake.

Prior to 1962, SR 534 utilized the Harpersfield Covered Bridge to cross the Grand River near Harpersfield, in the vicinity of its junction with SR 307.  In that year, a new alignment of the state highway was constructed, bypassing the covered bridge to the east.  As a result, the former alignment that utilized the covered bridge to pass over the Grand River was turned over to Ashtabula County, and renamed as County Road 154 (CR 154).

Major intersections

References

534
Transportation in Mahoning County, Ohio
Transportation in Trumbull County, Ohio
Transportation in Ashtabula County, Ohio